Lydia Church (born 13 October 1999) is a British Paralympic athlete who competes in shot put events in international level events. She won the silver medal at the 2021 World Para Athletics European Championships in women's shot put F12. Church was also selected to compete at the 2020 Summer Paralympics.

References

1999 births
Living people
Sportspeople from Peterborough
Paralympic athletes of Great Britain
British female shot putters
English female shot putters
Athletes (track and field) at the 2020 Summer Paralympics
Medalists at the World Para Athletics European Championships